Yvette Michele  (born Michele Yvette Bryant; 1972 in New York) is an American R&B singer.

Career

Michele released her debut album, My Dream, on August 26, 1997 on the RCA record label. From 1996-1998 she released three Top 20 singles on the US Billboard Hot Dance Music/Maxi-Singles Sales chart, "Everyday & Everynight" (#3), "I'm Not Feeling You" (#5)  and "DJ Keep Playin' (Get Your Music On)" (#19).

On March 5, 1997 "I'm Not Feeling You" was awarded the Billboard 'Greatest Gainer Sales' award for the biggest sales gain of the week.
Also, she parteciped in the song "Far From Yours" of the rapper O.C.

Discography

Albums
 My Dream (1997)

Singles

References

1972 births
Living people
Singer-songwriters from New York (state)
American contemporary R&B singers
American rhythm and blues singer-songwriters
American soul musicians
African-American women singer-songwriters
20th-century African-American women singers
20th-century African-American musicians

bpy:জয়া
new:जोया